Floris Mary Gillespie (1882–1967) was a Scottish watercolour painter and teacher.

Biography
Gillespie was born in Bonnybridge in Stirlingshire into an artistic family. Her brother, Alexander Bryson Gillespie and her sister Janetta also became artists and, later, the three siblings would sometimes exhibit works together.

Gillespie attended the Glasgow School of Art from 1913 to 1915 and then taught at Stranraer High School. She mostly painted flowers and still life compositions and, occasionally, landscapes in both oils and watercolours. Gillespie joined the Glasgow Society of Women Artists in 1928 and won their Lauder Award in 1948. She also exhibited with the Royal Scottish Academy, the Royal Scottish Watercolour Society and on a regular basis with the Glasgow Institute of the Fine Arts. Gillespie lived in her native Bonnybridge for most of her life but died in Edinburgh.

References

1882 births
1967 deaths
20th-century Scottish painters
20th-century Scottish women artists
Alumni of the Glasgow School of Art
People from Stirling (council area)
Scottish women painters
Sibling artists